Morimonella bednariki is a species of beetle in the family Cerambycidae, and the only species in the genus Morimonella. It was described by Podaný in 1979.

References

Morimopsini
Beetles described in 1979